A concubine is a woman who lives with and has sexual relations with a man but is not in a marital relationship with him. See Concubinage.

Concubine or The Concubine may also refer to:

Film 
 The Concubine (film), 2012 South Korean film

Literature 
 "The Concubine", 1765 poem by William Julius Mickle
 The Concubine (novel) 1966 novel by Nigerian writer Elechi Amadi

Music 
 The Concubine (band), American heavy metal band
 "Concubine", song by Converge from the 2001 album Jane Doe
 "Concubine", song by Inkubus Sukkubus from the 2001 album Supernature
 "Concubine", song by The Hooters from the 1983 album Amore
 "The Concubine", song by The Black Maria from the 2006 album A Shared History of Tragedy

See also